The River Rhaeadr is a river in Wales.

It starts at the Pistyll Rhaeadr waterfall a few miles from the village of Llanrhaeadr-ym-Mochnant, where the Afon Disgynfa falls over a 240-foot (73 m) cliff-face, after which the river is known as the Afon Rhaeadr.

Downstream, the Afon Rhaeadr runs into the Afon Tanat.

See also 

 River Wye (Afon Gwy)

External links 
Photos of the River Rhaeadr on geograph.org.uk

Rhaedr
2Rhaeadr